Tomtor is a rural locality (a selo), the only inhabited locality, and the administrative center of Tomtorsky Rural Okrug of Megino-Kangalassky District in the Sakha Republic, Russia, located  from Nizhny Bestyakh, the administrative center of the district. Its population as of the 2010 Census was 430, of whom 204 were male and 226 female, down from 452 as recorded during the 2002 Census.

It is one of the centers of population located in the Suola River basin.

References

Notes

Sources
Official website of the Sakha Republic. Registry of the Administrative-Territorial Divisions of the Sakha Republic. Megino-Kangalassky District. 

Rural localities in Megino-Kangalassky District